"El Burrito de Belén" (English: The Little Donkey from Bethlehem) or "El Burrito Sabanero" (English: The Little Donkey from the Savannah) is an aguinaldo from Venezuela. It was written by Hugo Blanco for the 1972 Christmas season. The song was first recorded by the Venezuelan folk singer Simón Díaz, included on his record, Las Gaitas de Simon where he was accompanied by the Venezuelan Children's Choir. Later, the children's musical group La Rondallita recorded the song in November 1972. This latest version gained popularity in Latin America. It has since been recorded many times by popular artists.

Cover versions
Colombian singer-songwriter Juanes recorded his own version of this famous Venezuelan song as the first radio single from the Christmas compilation album Superestrella en Navidades.
American singer, actress and talk show host Adrienne Houghton released "El Burrito Sabanero" on her debut solo album New Tradiciones. It features Freddy Bailon, Claudette Bailon, Beau Harper and Jet Marie on guest vocals.
American musician, singer, songwriter, rapper, record producer, and philanthropist Aloe Blacc released his own funky version named "Mi Burrito Sabanero" on his 2018/2019 Christmas album Christmas Funk.
The Arizona-based band Calexico included the song on their 2020 Christmas album Seasonal Shift, under the title "Mi Burrito Sabanero".
The Bronx-based bachata group Aventura recorded a bachata cover in 2008.

References

Venezuelan songs
Juanes songs
Christmas songs
Songs about mammals
2006 singles
Songs written by Hugo Blanco (musician)
1972 songs